Świeminko is a settlement in the administrative district of Gmina Biesiekierz, within Koszalin County, West Pomeranian Voivodeship, in northwestern Poland.

See also
 History of Pomerania

References

Villages in Koszalin County